Samir Musayev (born 17 March 1979) is a retired Azerbaijani football player. He has played for Azerbaijan national team.

Career statistics

National team statistics

Honours

Individual
Azerbaijan Premier League Top Scorer (1): 2003–04

References

External links

1979 births
Living people
Azerbaijani footballers
Association football forwards
Azerbaijan international footballers